Burak Özdemir (born March 24, 1994), known as CZN Burak, is a Turkish chef  and restaurateur. CZN, Özdemir's nickname, originates from a frequent mispronunciation of the Cinzano, the name of his father's textile shop in Laleli.

Entrepreneurship 
Burak owns the Hatay Civilizations Table chain of restaurants, which consists of five branches: Taksim, Aksaray, Etiler and overseas branches in Dubai and Tajikistan. and Doha (2022)

Popularity
Burak's preparation and presentation of Turkish recipes while almost always smiling to the camera have made Özdemir an Internet celebrity on platforms such as Instagram and TikTok.

Health
In May 2022, "Pray For Burak" posts were circulated on social media as Burak was rumored to have been suffering from a brain tumor.

References

External links
 

1995 births
Living people
Turkish chefs
People from Hatay Province
Turkish Sunni Muslims
20th-century Muslims
21st-century Muslims